Aksana Papko (born 16 November 1988) is a Belarusian track cyclist. At the 2012 Summer Olympics, she competed in the women's team pursuit for the national team.

Major results 
Source:
2007
 National Road Championships
2nd Road race
4th Time trial
2008
 2nd Time trial, National Road Championships
 3rd  Points Race, UEC European U23 Championships
2009
 2nd Road race, National Road Championships
2010
 National Road Championships
1st  Road race
1st  Time trial
 UEC European Under-23 Track Championships
1st Individual Pursuit
1st Points Race
3rd  Omnium
 4th Time trial, European Under-23 Road Championships

References

External links 
 

Belarusian female cyclists
1988 births
Living people
Olympic cyclists of Belarus
Cyclists at the 2012 Summer Olympics
Belarusian track cyclists